Tetnuldi is a prominent peak in the central part of the Greater Caucasus Mountain Range, located in the Svaneti region of Georgia. According to most sources, Tetnuldi is the 10th highest peak of the Caucasus. The slopes of the mountain are glaciated generally above the 3,000 metre (9,840 ft) line.  The most prominent glacier of the mountain is called Adishi.

It was first climbed by Douglas Freshfield in 1896.  The first ascent of the north face was completed by Michael S. Taylor and John R. Jenkins.

New ski resort in Tetnuldi was opened during 2015-2016 winter season.

References
2. Georgian Musical Project Hugo Salieri Released Track "Tetnuldi" in 2020 https://www.youtube.com/watch?v=nOxntcO6yh4
Georgian State (Soviet) Encyclopedia. 1983. Book 4. pp. 637.

Mountains of Georgia (country)
Four-thousanders of the Caucasus
Ski areas and resorts in Georgia (country)